The 1989 UK Athletics Championships was the national championship in outdoor track and field for the United Kingdom held at Monkton Stadium, Jarrow. It was the first time that the event was held in North East England. The men's 10,000 metres was dropped from the programme and replaced by a 3000 metres event. Strong winds affected the jumps programme and several of the sprint races.

It was the thirteenth edition of the competition limited to British athletes only, launched as an alternative to the AAA Championships, which was open to foreign competitors. However, due to the fact that the calibre of national competition remained greater at the AAA event, the UK Championships this year were not considered the principal national championship event by some statisticians, such as the National Union of Track Statisticians (NUTS). Many of the athletes below also competed at the 1989 AAA Championships.

Shot putter Judy Oakes won a sixth straight title and women's 400 m hurdler Elaine McLaughlin made it three consecutive wins for her. Three other athletes defended their 1988 UK titles: Ian McCombie (racewalk), Steve Backley (javelin) and Linda Keough (400 m). Liz McColgan won the women's 3000 metres, having been 5000 metres champion the previous year. Marcus Adam was the only athlete to win multiple titles that year, taking a men's short sprint double.

The main international track and field competition for the United Kingdom that year was the 1989 IAAF World Cup, where the men's team competed and women competed as part of the European team. Reflecting the secondary nature of the UK event, most of the individual British medallists at the World Cup did not compete here. Among those that did were Colin Jackson (hurdles runner-up), Stewart Faulkner (long jump bronze medallist), Jonathan Edwards (triple jump bronze medallist) and Steve Backley (javelin champion).

Medal summary

Men

Women

References

UK Athletics Championships
UK Outdoor Championships
Athletics Outdoor
Sport in Jarrow
Athletics competitions in England